Sir Lyman Poore Duff  (7 January 1865 – 26 April 1955) was the eighth Chief Justice of Canada. He was the longest serving justice of the Supreme Court of Canada.

Early life and career 
Born in Meaford, Canada West (now Ontario) to a Congregationalist minister, Duff received a Bachelor of Arts in mathematics and metaphysics from the University of Toronto in 1887. After graduation, he taught at Barrie Collegiate Institute while studying for the bar. Duff later took courses at Osgoode Hall Law School and was called to the Ontario Bar in 1893.

Duff practised as a lawyer in Fergus, Ontario after being called to the bar. In 1895, Duff moved to Victoria, British Columbia and continued his career there. In 1895, he was made a Queen's Counsel. In 1903, he took part, as junior counsel for Canada, in the Alaska Boundary arbitration.
In 1923 Mount Duff (Yakutat), also known as Boundary Peak 174 was named after him.

Judicial and other appointments

In 1904, he was appointed a puisne judge of the Supreme Court of British Columbia. In 1906 was appointed a justice of the Supreme Court of Canada. On January 14, 1914, he was appointed to Her Majesty's Most Honourable Privy Council. Duff was the first and only Puisne Justice of the Supreme Court of Canada to be appointed to the Imperial Privy Council. In 1924 he was elected honorary bencher of Gray's Inn, at the recommendation of Lord Birkenhead.

In 1931, he served as Administrator of the Government of Canada between the departure of Lord Bessborough for England and the arrival of Lord Tweedsmuir. Duff took on the position, as the Chief Justice was unavailable. As Administrator, Duff opened Parliament and read the Speech from the Throne on 12 March 1931, becoming the first Canadian-born person to do so.
In 1933, Duff was appointed Chief Justice of Canada, succeeding to Chief Justice Anglin. He was made a Knight Grand Cross of the Order of St. Michael and St. George the following year as a result of Prime Minister Richard Bennett's temporary suspension of the Nickle Resolution.

When Governor General Lord Tweedsmuir died in office on February 11, 1940, Chief Justice Duff became the Administrator of the Government. He held the office for nearly four months, until King George VI appointed Alexander Cambridge, 1st Earl of Athlone as Governor General on June 21, 1940. Duff was the first Canadian to hold the position, even in the interim. A Canadian-born Governor General was not appointed until Vincent Massey in 1952.

Duff also heard more than eighty appeals on the Judicial Committee of the Privy Council, mostly Canadian appeals; however, he never heard Privy Council appeals from the Supreme Court of Canada while he served on the latter. The last Privy Council appeal heard by Duff was the 1946 Reference Re Persons of Japanese Race.

In 1942, Duff served as the sole member of a Royal Commission constituted to examine the Liberal government's conduct in relation to the defence of Hong Kong. The resulting report, which completely exonerated the government, proved to be controversial, and was seen by many as a whitewash.

Upon reaching the mandatory retirement age for judges in 1939, his term of office was extended by three years by special Act of Parliament; in 1943, his term of office was extended for another year by Parliament. He retired as Chief Justice in 1944.

Impact

Duff employed a conservative form of statutory interpretation. In a 1935 Supreme Court judgment, he detailed how judges should interpret statutes:

Duff has been called a "master of trenchant and incisive English," who "wrote his opinions in a style which bears comparison with Holmes or Birkenhead." A former assistant of Duff, Kenneth Campbell, argued that Duff was "frequently ranked as the equal of Justices Holmes and Brandeis of the United States Supreme Court," and Gerald Le Dain asserted that Duff "is generally considered to have been one of Canada's greatest judges." Other writers have taken a less favourable view, instead arguing that Duff's reputation is largely unearned; his biographer concluded that he was not an original thinker, but essentially a "talent student and exponent of the law rather than a creator of it."

More recent commentary has focused on Duff's legal formalism and its effect on Canadian federalism. Bora Laskin attacked Duff's decisions, arguing that Duff used circular reasoning and hid his policy-laden decisions behind the doctrine of stare decisis. As well, Lionel Schipper noted that, in reviewing Duff's judgments, it was:

References

External links
 Supreme Court of Canada biography
 Lyman Poore Duff fonds

Chief justices of Canada
Canadian Anglicans
Lawyers in Ontario
Lawyers in British Columbia
Canadian King's Counsel
Members of the King's Privy Council for Canada
Canadian members of the Privy Council of the United Kingdom
University of Toronto alumni
People from Grey County
Canadian Knights Grand Cross of the Order of St Michael and St George
1865 births
1955 deaths
Members of the Judicial Committee of the Privy Council
Persons of National Historic Significance (Canada)
Osgoode Hall Law School alumni
Canadian scholars of constitutional law